Belgium competed at the 1984 Winter Olympics in Sarajevo, Yugoslavia.

Alpine skiing

Men

Women

Figure skating

Women

References
Official Olympic Reports
 Olympic Winter Games 1984, full results by sports-reference.com

Nations at the 1984 Winter Olympics
1984
Olympic